Hyrcanis or Hyrkaneis, also known as Hyrcania, was a Roman and Byzantine-era city and bishopric in ancient Lydia, now in western Turkey. It was situated in the Hyrcanian plain (τὸ Ὑρκάνιον πεδίον), which is said to have derived its name from a colony of Hyrcanians being settled here by the Persians. They were afterwards mingled with some Macedonians, who also settled in this district, whence they are called by Pliny the Elder and Tacitus "Macedones Hyrcani." The city minted its own coins.

Its site is located west of Halit Paşa in Asiatic Turkey, south of Çamlıyurt.

The city was also the seat of an ancient bishopric. Known bishops include:
Asyncritus
John, attendee at First Council of Constantinople
Eustathius
Dionysius fl.1157

References

Catholic titular sees in Asia
Defunct dioceses of the Ecumenical Patriarchate of Constantinople
Dioceses established in the 1st century
Ancient Greek archaeological sites in Turkey
Populated places in ancient Lydia
Roman towns and cities in Turkey
Former populated places in Turkey
Populated places of the Byzantine Empire
History of Manisa Province